The boys' doubles tournament of the 2016 Badminton Asia Junior Championships was held from July 13–17 at the CPB Badminton and Sports Science Training Center, Bangkok. The defending champions of the last edition is He Jiting and Zheng Siwei from China. He Jiting / Tan Qiang of China and Pakin Kuna-Anuvit / Natthapat Trinkajee of Thailand leads the seeding this year. The runner-up in the last edition Han Chengkai and Zhou Haodong of China emerged as the champion after upset their teammates, the first seeded He and Tan in the finals with the score 21–12, 21–17.

Seeded

 He Jiting / Tan Qiang (final)
 Pakin Kuna-Anuvit / Natthapat Trinkajee (third round)
 Han Chengkai / Zhou Haodong (champion)
 Andika Ramadiansyah / Rinov Rivaldy (quarter final)
 Warit Sarapat / Panachai Worasaktyanan (third round)
 Ooi Zi Heng / Soh Wooi Yik (semi final)
 Krishna Prasad Garaga / Dhruv Kapila (third round)
 Fan Qiuyue / Ren Xiangyu (semi final)

Draw

Finals

Top half

Section 1

Section 2

Section 3

Section 4

Bottom half

Section 5

Section 6

Section 7

Section 8

References

External links 
Main Draw

2016 Badminton Asia Junior Championships